Cyperus pseudodistans is a species of sedge that is native to northern parts of eastern South America.

See also 
 List of Cyperus species

References 

pseudodistans
Plants described in 1925
Flora of Venezuela
Flora of Suriname